William S. Lind (born July 9, 1947) is an American conservative author, described as being aligned with paleoconservatism. He is the author of many books and one of the first proponents of fourth-generation warfare (4GW) theory and is the Director of The American Conservative Center for Public Transportation. He used the pseudonym Thomas Hobbes in a column for The American Conservative.

Early life
Lind graduated from Dartmouth College in 1969 and from Princeton University in 1971, where he received a master's degree in history. In 1973, having grown tired of doctoral work at Princeton, Lind wrote to Senator Robert Taft Jr. of
Ohio requesting his help in securing a job with Amtrak. In response, Taft instead offered Lind a job in his office, where he eventually began analyzing defense policy (Taft was a member of the United States Senate Committee on Armed Services).

Views on warfare and U.S. military
In 1989, alongside several U.S. military officers, Lind helped to originate fourth-generation war (4GW) theory.

Lind served as a legislative aide for Taft from 1973 through 1976 and held a similar position with Senator Gary Hart of Colorado from 1977 to 1986. He is the author of the Maneuver Warfare Handbook (Westview Press, 1985) and co-author, with Hart, of America Can Win: The Case for Military Reform.

Lind has written for the Marine Corps Gazette, Defense and the National Interest, (D-N-I.net), and The American Conservative.

According to the book Boyd: The Fighter Pilot Who Changed The Art of War by the writer Robert Coram, Lind was during lectures on maneuver warfare sometimes criticized for having never served in the military and for having "never dodged a bullet, he had never led men in combat, he had never even worn a uniform." Coram writes that when challenged by an officer, Lind "cut him off at the knees."

Political career and related writings
Lind was the Director of the Center for Cultural Conservatism at the Free Congress Foundation. He advocates a Declaration of Cultural Independence by cultural conservatives in the United States and believes that the federal government ceased to represent their interests and began to coerce them into negative behavior and to affect their culture in a negative fashion. The foundation believes that American culture and its institutions are headed for a collapse and that cultural conservatives should separate themselves from that calamity. It also supports setting up independent parallel institutions with a right to secession and a highly decentralized nature that would rely on individual responsibility and discipline to remain intact but prevent the takeover of the institutions by those hostile to cultural conservatism.

Lind has authored and co-authored (with Paul Weyrich) monographs on behalf of the Free Congress Foundation that attempt to persuade American conservatives to support government funding for mass transit programs, especially urban rail transit. The two men wrote about Cultural Marxism as being an organized conspiracy against what Lind views as the traditional Christian values of America.

Lind was Associate Publisher of a quarterly magazine called The New Electric Railway Journal from its launch in 1988 to 1996, and from January 1994, he also co-hosted a monthly program about light rail on the National Empowerment Television network; the program used the same name as the magazine.

As a paleoconservative, Lind has often criticized neoconservatives in his commentaries. While not a libertarian, he has also written for LewRockwell.com. He is a self-proclaimed conservative and monarchist. He is a staunch supporter of a non-interventionist foreign policy.

In his column of December 15, 2009, Lind announced that he was leaving the staff of the Center unexpectedly and that his series of articles was on hiatus.

Fiction
Lind also wrote Victoria: A Novel of 4th Generation War in which a group of "Christian Marines" leads an armed resistance against Cultural Marxism as the US federal government collapses.

Criticism
In the Southern Poverty Law Center (SPLC) report "Reframing the Enemy" (2003), Bill Berkowitz said that Lind was the principal promoter and popularizer of the Cultural Marxism conspiracy theory, which claims that a coterie of Jewish-German philosophers, the Frankfurt School, had seized control of American popular culture, and have been systematically subverting Christian churches and ethics within the US. The conspiracists' preoccupation with the Jewishness of most Frankfurt School intellectuals is seen as confirming that Cultural Marxism is an antisemitic canard. The SPLC reported that in 1999 Lind wrote, "The real damage to race relations in the South came, not from slavery, but [from] Reconstruction, which would not have occurred if the South had won [the civil war]."

In "The Widening Gap Between the Military and Society" (1997), the journalist Thomas E. Ricks said that Lind's rhetoric of Marxist cultural subversion is different from the "standard right-wing American rhetoric of the '90s" because Lind said that the "next real war we fight is likely to be on American soil." In The Future of Freedom: Illiberal Democracy at Home and Abroad  (2003) Fareed Zakaria said, "There are those in the West who agree with bin Laden that Islam is the reason for the Middle East's turmoil. Preachers such as Pat Robertson and Jerry Falwell Sr., and writers such as Paul Johnson and William Lind have made the case that Islam is a religion of repression and backwardness."

The manifesto of Anders Breivik is built around Lind's theory on cultural Marxism and contains 27 pages taken directly from his writings.

References

External links
 William S. Lind at TraditionalRight
 William Lind at Lew Rockwell.com: Archives
 "Political Correctness": A Short History of an Ideology by William S. Lind
 Rage Against the Machine by William S. Lind archived from the original
 Declaration of Cultural Independence
 Military.com mini-bio of William S. Lind
 

1947 births
Living people
20th-century American male writers
20th-century American non-fiction writers
21st-century American male writers
21st-century American non-fiction writers
American anti-communists
American columnists
American conspiracy theorists
American critics of Islam
American foreign policy writers
American male non-fiction writers
American military writers
American monarchists
American political writers
Anti-Marxism
Anti-Masonry
Catholics from Ohio
Critics of neoconservatism
Dartmouth College alumni
Non-interventionism
Paleoconservatism
Princeton University alumni
Roman Catholic writers
Writers from Cleveland